Felix Drahotta (born 1 January 1989) is a German former representative rower. He is a three-time Olympian, an Olympic silver medallist and rowed in the German men's eight at consecutive World Rowing Championships from 2013 and 2015.

Along with Tom Lehmann he finished 4th in the men's coxless pair at the 2008 Summer Olympics. He and Anton Braun finished 7th in the men's pair at the 2012 Summer Olympics.  At the 2016 Summer Olympics in Rio de Janeiro, he rowed in Germany's men's eight which won the silver medal.

Personal
Drahotta was born in Bad Doberan, East Germany. His club rowing was from the Rostock Rowing Club until and then the Bayer Leverkusen Rowing Club.

Drahotta along with the other eight 2016 Olympic silver medal rowers was awarded the Silbernes Lorbeerblatt (Silver Laurel Leaf), Germany's highest sports award, for the achievement.

International rowing career
At the world class level, he rowed in the German men's eights that won silver at the 2013, 2014 and 2015 World Championships.

At the European level, he was in the German eight who won gold at the 2013, 2014, 2015 and 2016 European championships. The 2016 Europeans were on home water in Brandenburg.

References

External links 
 
 

1989 births
Living people
People from Bad Doberan
People from Bezirk Rostock
German male rowers
Sportspeople from Mecklenburg-Western Pomerania
Olympic rowers of Germany
Rowers at the 2008 Summer Olympics
Rowers at the 2012 Summer Olympics
Rowers at the 2016 Summer Olympics
World Rowing Championships medalists for Germany
Olympic silver medalists for Germany
Medalists at the 2016 Summer Olympics
Olympic medalists in rowing
Recipients of the Silver Laurel Leaf
European Rowing Championships medalists